Socialist Trade Union Centre is a trade union federation in Kerala, India. It was started in 2003 by the Sree Narayana Dharma Paripalana, an Ezhava caste-based movement. Its first affiliated union was the Socialist Motor Thozhilali Union, a union of autorickshaw drivers in Kottayam.

References

Trade unions in India
Trade unions in Kerala
Trade unions established in 2003
2003 establishments in Kerala